Nicholas Georgiade (March 25, 1933 – December 19, 2021) was an American film and television actor, best known for playing Agent Rico Rossi in the television series The Untouchables.

Early life and education
Georgiade was born in New York City on March 25, 1933, of Greek ancestry. After serving four years with the U.S. Army in Berlin, he attended Syracuse University, where he was a heavyweight boxer for three years. Intending to become a teacher, he majored in sociology and psychology, and graduated 1956. Lucille Ball discovered him when he acted in a little theatre production in Hollywood, which led to his participation in the Desilu Workshop theater.

Career
Georgiade featured in 37 movies and television programs. His career in television began on the December 11, 1958 Playhouse 90 episode titled Seven Against the Wall with Warren Oates, Tige Andrews, and Paul Lambert. Georgiade followed this with playing Tommy on the January 23, 1960 Westinghouse Desilu Playhouse episode Meeting at Appalachia which included Cameron Mitchell and Jack Warden.

Other appearances were on such notable programs as Hawaiian Eye, Hawaii Five-O, Daniel Boone, Batman, I Spy, Kojak, and The Rockford Files. He also had a brief appearance as a prisoner in "Hang 'Em High".  His best-known role was that of Federal Agent Enrico "Rico" Rossi on 105 episodes of the 1959-1963 hit ABC TV program, The Untouchables. He had a small uncredited role as a police detective in It's a Mad, Mad, Mad, Mad World (1963). He also had roles in The Young Runaways (1968), Stacey (1973), Seven (1979), Mugsy's Girls (1985), Picasso Trigger (1988) and Indecent Proposal (1993).

From May 2016 until his death, Georgiade was the last living regular cast member of  The Untouchables, as well as one of two surviving cast members of It's a Mad, Mad, Mad, Mad World, the other being Barrie Chase.

Personal life and death
Georgiade married Anita Khanzadian in 1956, whilst he was a senior in college. In 1964, he remarried after meeting New York model, Davee Decker, who was then 28. In 1977, he married Alicia Razaf, who was 18 years his senior. They remained married until her death in January 2017, at the age of 102.

He died in Las Vegas on December 19, 2021, at the age of 88. He was survived by his daughter, Anastazia Juliet Georgiade.

References

External links

1933 births
2021 deaths
American male film actors
American male television actors
American people of Greek descent
Male actors from New York City
Military personnel from New York City
Syracuse University College of Arts and Sciences alumni